Gloria Ella Saunders (September 29, 1927 – June 4, 1980 ) was an American actress of film and television, primarily from the late 1940s to 1960.

Career
Saunders acting career began on stage. She was discovered when she performed in a production of Rebecca in the southern United States, after which she acted in a San Francisco production of Adam Ate His Apple.

Saunders appeared as a radio operator in the war film O.S.S. (1946) and in the Columbia Pictures film Red Snow (1952), and she portrayed Zelda in the Columbia production Prisoners of the Casbah (1953).

References

External links
 

1927 births
1980 deaths
American stage actresses
American television actresses
American film actresses
Actresses from Columbia, South Carolina
Actresses from Charlotte, North Carolina
People from Greater Los Angeles
20th-century American actresses